The 1953 Challenge Desgrange-Colombo was the sixth edition of the Challenge Desgrange-Colombo. It included eleven races: all the races form the 1952 edition were retained with no additions. Loretto Petrucci won the individual championship while Italy retained the nations championship.

Races

Final standings

Riders

Nations

References

 
Challenge Desgrange-Colombo
Challenge Desgrange-Colombo